Lepthoplosternum stellatum is a species of catfish of the family Callichthyidae.  This species is so far known from the type locality only, the Igarapé Repartimento, a tributary of the mouthbay lake, Tefé Lake, some 6 km south of the town of Tefé, Amazonas, Brazil.

References
 

Callichthyidae
Fish of South America
Fish of Brazil
Taxa named by Roberto Esser dos Reis
Fish described in 2005